"Highway Corroboree" is a comedy single by Austen Tayshus. Released in January 1988 as the lead single from Austen Tayshus' second studio album, Whispering Joke. The song peaked at number 43 on the Australian charts. 

At the ARIA Music Awards of 1989, the song was nominated for ARIA Award for Best Comedy Release.

Track listing
 Vinyl/CD Single (EMI Music)
Side A "Highway Corroboree" 
Side B "Rolling Stones Reunion"

Charts

References 

1988 singles
1988 in Australia
Australian comedy
Comedy songs